The Electronic Journal of Academic and Special Librarianship was a peer-reviewed electronic academic journal  in the areas of academic and special libraries.  It published 10 volumes between 1999 and 2009.

For a decade, the journal was totally committed to the discussion and promotion of open access for all academic research. It was published and distributed by the International Consortium for the Advancement of Academic Publication. It was originally named the Journal of Southern Academic and Special Librarianship and changed its name in 2002 to reflect its international scope. The founding editor was Paul G. Haschak (Xavier University of Louisiana). The journal is permanently archived by Library and Archives Canada. During its active years, it was listed in the Directory of Open Access Journals and indexed and abstracted by Library and Information Science Abstracts and Library Literature and Information Science. It was last published in 2009.

References
Haschak, P.G. (2007). The 'platinum route' to open access, a case study of E-JASL:  The Electronic Journal of Academic and Special Librarianship. Information Research, 12(4): paper 321.
Sosteric, Mike (April 1999). "Freedom from the Press: Alternative Academic Publication Strategies and the True Potentials of Information Technology". The Technology Source.
Jean Caswell, Paul G. Haschak, Dayne Sherman (2005). New challenges facing academic librarians today: electronic journals, archival digitization, document delivery, etc. Edwin Mellen Press. .
Sosteric, Michael (October 2004). "The International Consortium for the Advancement of Academic Publication - an idea whose time has come (finally!)". Learned Publishing. 17 (4): 319–325.

External links

Library Literature and Information Science

Open access journals
Library science journals
English-language journals
Online-only journals